is a 2021 Japanese anime television series adaptation of the action role-playing game The World Ends with You published by Square Enix. The anime was a joint production between Square Enix, DOMERICA, and Shin-Ei Animation.

Cast and Characters

Production and release
The anime series was directed by Kazuya Ichikawa with screenplay adapted from the game by Midori Gotō. Tetsuya Nomura and Gen Kobayashi designed the characters, and Takeharu Ishimoto composed the series' music. The game's producer Tomohiko Hirano and director Tatsuya Kando were supervising. According to Kando, there had always been intent to create an anime series from the game, but there had not been time or budget at the time of the game's release. Early thoughts by Kando were positive based on how similar the storyboards were to the original game. Ichikawa wanted the anime to be recognized as his masterpiece. The original cast returned with Kōki Uchiyama voicing the lead Neku.

A preview of the first episode for the anime was released on September 18, 2020, alongside announcements of online campaigns to promote the series. As more than a decade had passed from the game's release to the anime's broadcast, some of the elements of the game had been modernized for the anime series, such as the use of smartphones rather than the original's choice of flip phones. The opening theme is "Twister -Animation OP ver.-" performed by MJR, while the ending theme is "Carpe Diem" performed by ASCA. The opening theme was originally scheduled to be "Teenage City Riot" by ALI, but was replaced just prior to the series' airing following the arrest of the band's drummer Kahadio over an alleged refund scam. It aired worldwide from April 10 to June 26, 2021, through Funimation, as well as the Super Animeism block on MBS and TBS. 

On September 16, 2021, Funimation announced the anime series would receive an English dub, which premiered the following day. Following Sony's acquisition of Crunchyroll, the series was moved to Crunchyroll.

Episode list

Reception
Anime News Network published a feature article authored by The Cartoon Cipher in June 2021, which analyzed in detail the differences between the original 2007 video game, and the first three episodes of the anime adaptation. Kaile Hultner from Polygon found that the anime is helpful as it provides "vital context" delivered in a concise manner for the extensive amount of in-universe terminology employed by the 2021 video game sequel, Neo: The World Ends With You. Alex Lukas from CBR praised the anime adaptation's fluid animation and faithful recreation of the source material's distinctive art style. He criticized the pacing issues of its early episodes, which gave him the impression that it is meant to be little more than a promotional effort for the then-upcoming Neo: The World Ends With You.

Anime Feminist criticized the gory deaths of several of its protagonists for three of them not being enough time to mourn properly, something casual viewers would be confused in general as a result of the pacing in comparison to the original game. Nevertheless, the writers recommended the anime to both casual and gaming fans as a result of how the anime properly develops the characters after such violent episodes.

Notes

References

External links
 Official anime website 
 

2021 anime television series debuts
Animeism
Anime television series based on video games
Crunchyroll anime
Fiction about death games
Medialink
Shibuya
Shin-Ei Animation
Works based on Square Enix video games